Issele-uku is an ancestral city in Nigeria's Delta State and headquarters for the Local Government Area of Aniocha North. It is also the Episcopal See of the Bishop of the Roman Catholic Diocese of Issele-Uku. It has its own post office and is served by the nearby new Asaba International Airport.

History 
Issee-Uku and Benin City were part of formal Bende State. The Issele-uku Association of North America has written a brief history of this area including an explanation of the origin of the name of the city.

References 

Obi of Issele-uku confirms Issele-uku is Benin in an Interview with Punch

 Wikimapia.org map of Issele-Uku and the surrounding area
 Federal Government of Nigeria official website
 Office of the Governor of Delta State 
 DeltaState.com
 U.S.A. Department of State page about Nigeria
 Embassy of the Federal Republic of Nigeria, Washington, DC
 True Face of Delta
 NigeriaWorld.com
  Asaba International Airport

External links 

 

 Issele-Uku Association of North America
 Issele-Uku People's Forum for Development 
 Nigerian Postal Service
 GeoNames information about the local towns

Cities in Delta State